Robbins is a census-designated place (CDP) in Sutter County, California. The ZIP Code is 95676. The community is inside area code 530. The 2010 United States census reported Robbins's population was 222.

Geography
According to the United States Census Bureau, the CDP covers an area of 2.6 square miles (6.7 km), 99.67% of it land and 0.33% of it water.

Demographics
The 2010 United States Census reported that Robbins had a population of 323. The racial makeup of Robbins was 208 (64.4%) White, 0 (0.0%) African American, 9 (2.8%) Native American, 5 (1.5%) Asian, 0 (0.0%) Pacific Islander, 94 (29.1%) from other races, and 7 (2.2%) from two or more races. Hispanic or Latino of any race were 181 persons (56.0%).

The Census reported that 323 people (100% of the population) lived in households, 0 (0%) lived in non-institutionalized group quarters, and 0 (0%) were institutionalized.

There were 107 households, out of which 43 (40.2%) had children under the age of 18 living in them, 60 (56.1%) were opposite-sex married couples living together, 10 (9.3%) had a female householder with no husband present, 9 (8.4%) had a male householder with no wife present.  There were 6 (5.6%) unmarried opposite-sex partnerships, and 0 (0%) same-sex married couples or partnerships. 21 households (19.6%) were made up of individuals, and 4 (3.7%) had someone living alone who was 65 years of age or older. The average household size was 3.02.  There were 79 families (73.8% of all households); the average family size was 3.58.

The population was spread out, with 86 people (26.6%) under the age of 18, 21 people (6.5%) aged 18 to 24, 97 people (30.0%) aged 25 to 44, 92 people (28.5%) aged 45 to 64, and 27 people (8.4%) who were 65 years of age or older.  The median age was 36.2 years. For every 100 females, there were 113.9 males.  For every 100 females age 18 and over, there were 119.4 males.

The homeowner vacancy rate was 2.5%; the rental vacancy rate was 11.8%.  223 people (69.0% of the population) lived in owner-occupied housing units and 100 people (31.0%) lived in rental housing units.

Politics
In the state legislature, Robbins is in the 4th Senate District, represented by Republican Doug LaMalfa, and in the 2nd Assembly District, represented by Republican Jim Nielsen.

References

Census-designated places in Sutter County, California
Census-designated places in California